Thrasops is a genus of snakes in the family Colubridae. The genus is endemic to Africa.

Species
Thrasops flavigularis 
Thrasops jacksonii 
Thrasops occidentalis 
Thrasops schmidti

Etymologies
The generic name, Thrasops, is from Greek Θρασος (Thrasos) meaning "bold" and ῶφ (ops) meaning "eye".

The specific name, jacksonii, is in honor of English ornithologist Frederick John Jackson.

The specific name, schmidti, is in honor of American herpetologist Karl Patterson Schmidt.

References

Further reading
Hallowell E (1857). "Notice of a collection of Reptiles from the Gaboon country, West Africa, recently presented to the Academy of Natural Sciences of Philadelphia, by Dr. Henry A. Ford". Proc. Acad Nat. Sci. Philadelphia 9: 48-72. (Thrasops, new genus, p. 67).
Spawls, Stephen; Howell, Kim; Drewes, Robert; Ashe, James (2001). A Field Guide to the Reptiles of East Africa. Princeton Field Guide Series. Princeton, New Jersey: Princeton University Press. 544 pp. .

Colubrids
Snake genera